The Măgheruș (also: Aluniș) is a small river in the Gurghiu Mountains, Harghita County, central Romania. It is a left tributary of the river Mureș. It flows through the municipality Toplița, and joins the Mureș in the village Măgheruș (part of Toplița), where it is channelized. Its name is from the Hungarian "mogyoró", and means "Nutty Creek".

References

Rivers of Romania
Rivers of Harghita County